Richard M. Ketchum (1922–2012) was an American historian and magazine editor. Historian Douglas Brinkley has said that Ketchum was "the finest historian of the American Revolution."

Early life

Ketchum was born in Pittsburgh, Pennsylvania, on March 15, 1922, to George and Thelma Patton Ketchum. He graduated from Yale College in 1943 with a degree in American history. During World War II, Ketchum served as commander of a Navy submarine chaser in the Atlantic.

Career

Ketchum owned an advertising agency until 1951 and worked at the U. S. Information Agency.

Ketchum worked for the American Heritage Publishing Company from 1956 until 1974.  He wrote 33 articles for American Heritage Magazine.

In 1974, Ketchum moved to Shelburne, Vermont, where he co-founded Country Journal, a magazine that "offered a blend of the bucolic and the practical, particularly to city folk who had opted for the rural life," according to The New York Times. The magazine was popular, reaching a circulation of 300,000.  It was sold in 1984.  The magazine was originally called the Blair & Ketchum’s Country Journal before it was simply renamed to Country Journal.

Ketchum was the author of numerous books. The Borrowed Years, 1938–1941 (1989) described the events leading up to the bombing of Pearl Harbor. Ketchum was particularly interested in the American Revolution.  His last book, Victory at Yorktown: The Campaign That Won the Revolution was an account of the battle and unlikely triumph that led to American independence.

Bibliography

Revolutionary War Books
 1962: Decisive Day: The Battle for Bunker Hill
 1973: The Winter Soldiers: The Battles for Trenton and Princeton
 1974: The World of George Washington
 1997: Saratoga: Turning Point of America's Revolutionary War
 2002: Divided Loyalties: How the American Revolution Came to New York
 2004: Victory at Yorktown: The Campaign That Won the Revolution

Other Books
 1965: The American Heritage Book of Great Historic Places
 1970: Faces from the Past
 1970: The Secret Life of the Forest
 1973: Will Rogers: His Life and Times
 1989: The Borrowed Years, 1938–1941

Selected articles
 “The Decisive Day Is Come (Battle of Bunker Hill),” American Heritage, August 1962, Volume 13, Issue 5
 "England’s Vietnam: The American Revolution," American Heritage, June 1971, Volume 22, Issue 4
 "The Spirit Of ’54," American Heritage, August/September 2002, Volume 53, Issue 4

References

External links
 American Heritage Author Page (with links to articles by Richard Ketchum)
 Obituary: Richard M. Ketchum, Burlington Free Press
 Richard M. Ketchum | Rural-life journalist, 89, Philly.com.

1922 births
American historians
2012 deaths
Yale College alumni
United States Navy personnel of World War II